Cornelius Arnold (1711-1757?), was a poetical writer.

Arnold was born 13 March 1711, and entered Merchant Taylors' School in 1723. The statement that he became one of the ushers in the school is incorrect. In the latter part of his life he was beadle to the Worshipful Company of Distillers.

His works are:
'Distress, a poetical essay,' dedicated to John Robartes, 4th Earl of Radnor, London [1750?], 4to.
 'Commerce, a poem,' 2nd edit. London, 1751, 4to.
'The Mirror. A Poetical Essay in the manner of Spenser,' dedicated to David Garrick, London, 1755, 4to.
 'Osman,' a tragedy. In a volume of poems published in 1757.

References

1711 births
1750s deaths
People educated at Merchant Taylors' School, Northwood
Year of death uncertain
18th-century English poets
English male poets
18th-century English male writers
18th-century English writers